Kolonia Klementowice  is a part of Klementowice in the administrative district of Gmina Kurów, within Puławy County, Lublin Voivodeship, in eastern Poland.

References

Kolonia Klementowice